The Angels were an American girl group that originated from New Jersey, best known for their 1963 No. 1 hit single "My Boyfriend's Back".

History 
The group originated in New Jersey as the Starlets which consisted of sisters Barbara "Bibs" and Phyllis "Jiggs" Allbut, Bernadette Carroll, and Lynda Malzone. They had minor local hits and wound up doing back-up work in the studio. When Malzone left, Linda Jansen became the new lead singer. Their manager, Tom DeCillis, turned his focus to Bernadette Carroll and dropped the rest of the group. Carroll would find solo success in 1964 with her Laurie Records single "Party Girl". After a failed attempt at a record deal with producer Gerry Granahan, the Allbut sisters turned their focus to education: Phyllis was in teacher's college at the time and Barbara was accepted into the Juilliard School for her abilities as a musical arranger. Soon Granahan, who had previously rejected the group, saw hit potential in the song they had performed for him in their audition, a version of "Till", and wanted them to record it in the studio. "Till" became their first single under their new name, the Angels, and also their first hit (No. 14 US) when it was released by Granahan's Caprice label in 1962. The song was followed up with a second national hit, "Cry Baby Cry". The Angels had one album on Caprice, titled ...And the Angels Sing, in 1962.

Jansen left the group in late 1962 to go solo and was replaced by Peggy Santiglia, formerly of The Delicates (with Denise Ferri and Arleen Lanzotti). Santiglia had sung jingles for WINS Radio, appeared on Broadway, and had songwriting experience. In 1963, the trio signed to Mercury Records' subsidiary label Smash Records and began working with the Feldman-Goldstein-Gottehrer songwriting team, who wrote "My Boyfriend's Back". The Angels' performance (with Santiglia on lead) was originally intended as a demo for The Shirelles' consideration, but the music publishers chose instead to release it as it stood. The song was a major hit, reaching number one on the Billboard Hot 100. "My Boyfriend's Back" sold over one million copies, and was awarded a gold disc. The follow-up was the lower-charting "I Adore Him" (No. 25 US). The B-side "Thank You And Goodnight" charted at No. 84 US. During their Smash career, the Angels maintained a steady string of moderately successful singles which included "Wow Wow Wee (He's The Boy For Me)" (No. 41 US). Their album My Boyfriend's Back  made the top forty, charting at No. 33. but their next, A Halo to You, did not chart. The group left Smash in 1964 and signed with Congress Records.

The group became the Halos, following a dispute over the ownership of the name "the Angels". Peggy Santiglia took a leave of absence from the group in 1965 and was replaced by Toni Mason. The group released several more singles, none of which charted. Mason left the group in 1967 and was replaced by Debra Swisher (previously of The Pixies Three), who had recently recorded and released her own version of "Thank You And Goodnight" on the ABC-Paramount Records subsidiary, Boom Records. This lineup resumed using the name "the Angels" and released a handful of singles on RCA Records. Former Starlet Bernadette Carroll was back in the group and became the new lead. They appeared on The Dean Martin Show before disbanding in 1968. Santiglia and Phyllis and Barbara Allbut regrouped in the early 1970s and released a new single on Polydor Records.

Phyllis Allbut and Santiglia continued to perform as the Angels, joined occasionally by Barbara Allbut.

In 2005, the Angels were inducted in the Vocal Group Hall of Fame.

Depicted by actresses, the Angels are shown singing "My Boyfriend's Back" in the 2014 film Jersey Boys, based on the Broadway hit musical about Frankie Valli and The Four Seasons. Both groups originated in New Jersey.

On October 5, 2018, former member Bernadette Carroll died at the age of 74.

On February 19, 2019, the Angels' original lead singer Linda Jansen died at the age of 74.

On July 10, 2021, founding member Barbara "Bibs" Allbut Brown died at the age of 80 leaving her sister Phyllis and Peggy as the last remaining founding members of the group still alive.

Members 
 Barbara "Bibs" Allbut Brown (born September 24, 1940, in Orange, New Jersey; died July 10, 2021)
 Phyllis "Jiggs" Allbut Sirico (born September 24, 1942, in Orange, New Jersey)
 Linda Jansen (born Linda Jankowski, July 7, 1944, in Newark, New Jersey; died February 19, 2019)
 Peggy Santiglia Ricker (born May 4, 1944, in Belleville, New Jersey)
 Bernadette Carroll (born Bernadette Dalia, June 21, 1944, in Elizabeth, New Jersey; died October 5, 2018, at her home in Florida)

Discography

Albums

Singles

The Starlets

The Angels

References

Bibliography 
 Clemente, John (2000). Girl Groups – Fabulous Females That Rocked The World. Iola, Wisconsin, Krause Publications. pp. 276. 
 Clemente, John (2013). Girl Groups – Fabulous Females Who Rocked The World. Bloomington, Indiana, Authorhouse Publications. pp. 623.  (sc);  (e)

External links 
 
 The Starlets known as The Angels, The Powder Puffs, The Beach Nuts, The Halos
 The Angels at classicbands.com
 The Angels at history-of-rock.com
 American singing groups by Jay Warner
 Fantasia featuring Peggy Santiglia
 The Angels (Gee) R&B 1954–1958 by Marv Goldberg
 Theangelsonline.com
 

RCA Records artists
Smash Records artists
Polydor Records artists
Vocal trios
American pop music groups
American pop girl groups
Musical groups from New Jersey
Musical groups established in 1963
1963 establishments in New Jersey